The 2019–20 Donar season was the 48th season in the existence of the club. The club will play in the Dutch Basketball League (DBL) and NBB Cup. Donar also played the qualifying rounds of the Basketball Champions League. It was the fifth season under head coach Erik Braal. 

On 12 March 2020, the season was postponed until 31 March because of the COVID-19 pandemic. On 14 March, the DBL announced to suspend the competition to at least 2 May. On 20 March, the DBL cancelled the rest of the season while naming no champion.

Players

Squad information

Players with multiple nationalities
  Jason Dourisseau

Depth chart

Transactions

In 

|}

Out

|}

Preseason

Dutch Basketball League

Regular season

Basketball Champions League

First qualifying round

FIBA Europe Cup

Regular season

Statistics

Source:

Dutch Basketball League

References

External links
 Donar website

Donar
Donar
Donar (basketball club)